Alymova is a rural locality (a selo) in Karachevsky District, Bryansk Oblast, Russia. The population was 186 as of 2010. There are 8 streets.

Geography 
Alymova is located 18 km southeast of Karachev (the district's administrative centre) by road. Dolgy is the nearest rural locality.

References 

Rural localities in Karachevsky District